is a type of Japanese pottery that was made by the Buddhist nun Ōtagaki Rengetsu (1791–1875). 

She was a prolific poet and calligrapher, but also an artisan. She created a number of vessels for sencha and chanoyu tea drinking traditions. She also created a large number of sake vessels such as tokuri flasks and guinomi cups. She adorned her ceramics with poems written in her calligraphic style. 

Her style of ware was continued even after her death and a traditional center of production was in Okazaki, Kyoto.

References

Further reading 
 Meher McArthur, The Sake Wares of Otagaki Rengetsu, Black Robe White Mist, p. 77.

External links 

 https://books.google.com/books?id=EFI7tr9XK6EC&pg=RA2-PA398&lpg=RA2-PA398&dq=rengetsu+ware&source=bl&ots=oZiPO_awcM&sig=1qIVt1K8-2TnJFfH4hA9aSg1Koc&hl=de&sa=X&ved=0ahUKEwjN9vDz5vvOAhVBbRQKHbH3CuUQ6AEIJzAB#v=onepage&q=rengetsu%20ware&f=false
 http://morikami.org/otagaki-rengetsu-lotus-moon/
 http://www.kyoto-u.ac.jp/maibun/nf/artifact-nf3.html#kinsei3 

Culture in Kyoto Prefecture
Japanese pottery